The Gresham Baronetcy, of Lympsfield in the County of Surrey, was a title in the Baronetage of England. It was created on 31 July 1660 for Marmaduke Gresham, Member of Parliament for East Grinstead and Bletchingley. He was a descendant of Sir John Gresham, Lord Mayor of London. The second Baronet was also member of parliament for Bletchingley. The title became extinct on the death of the sixth Baronet in 1801.

Gresham baronets, of Lympsfield (1660)
Sir Marmaduke Gresham, 1st Baronet (1627–1696)
Sir Edward Gresham, 2nd Baronet (1649–1709)
Sir Charles Gresham, 3rd Baronet (1660–1718)
Sir Marmaduke Gresham, 4th Baronet (1700–1742)
Sir Charles Gresham, 5th Baronet (died 1750)
Sir John Gresham, 6th Baronet (1735–1801)

References

Extinct baronetcies in the Baronetage of England